Hunde Toure (born 1 February 1943) is an Ethiopian racewalker. He competed in the men's 20 kilometres walk at the 1972 Summer Olympics and the 1980 Summer Olympics.

References

1943 births
Living people
Athletes (track and field) at the 1972 Summer Olympics
Athletes (track and field) at the 1980 Summer Olympics
Ethiopian male racewalkers
Olympic athletes of Ethiopia
Place of birth missing (living people)